Kirkwood station, also called the Kirkwood Missouri Pacific Depot, is a suburban Amtrak train station in Kirkwood, Missouri, United States. Located in downtown Kirkwood, it is one of three Amtrak stations in the St. Louis metropolitan area; the other two are the Gateway Multimodal Transportation Center in downtown St. Louis, and the Alton station. The station is run entirely by volunteers. It is the third-busiest Amtrak station in Missouri.

History 
In 1851, land where the current station is located (Argonne Avenue and Kirkwood Road) was obtained from Owen Collins by the Pacific Railroad for a right of way. The track for the Pacific Railroad to Kirkwood was completed in 1853. The first train arrived May 11, 1853, for an auction sale of lots, making Kirkwood the first planned suburb west of the Mississippi. The town was named for the chief engineer for the railroad, James P. Kirkwood.

In 1863, a frame depot was built. Here members of the first school board met to draft the charter of the Kirkwood School District, which was granted in 1865. In 1893, Douglas Donovan was hired by the Missouri Pacific Railroad to construct the current stone station to replace the wooden station. The current station remains today as an outstanding example of Richardsonian Romanesque architecture.

Commuter trains ran to and from Kirkwood until 1961. A train turn-table was located near the present Farmers Market for the engines to be turned for the return trip to St. Louis and for the helper engines, which were used to help freight trains manage the "Kirkwood Hill," prior to the arrival of diesel engines.  Though originally deemed ineligible for such status, the station was listed on the National Register of Historic Places on July 5, 1985.

On November 9, 2022, Amtrak announced that it planned to work on improving the station.

See also 
List of Amtrak stations

References

External links 

 Kirkwood, MO – USA Rail Guide (TrainWeb)

Amtrak stations in Missouri
Railway stations in the United States opened in 1893
Kirkwood, Missouri
Railway stations on the National Register of Historic Places in Missouri
National Register of Historic Places in St. Louis County, Missouri